Sacred Heart Catholic Church and Parsonage is a historic Roman Catholic church located on Route U in Rich Fountain in Osage County, Missouri.  The church was built in 1879, and is a one-story, rectangular building constructed of cut- and squared buff-limestone rubble blocks. It measures approximately 45 feet by 140 feet and has a gabled, red tile roof installed in 1925. The church displays vernacular Gothic Revival and Romanesque Revival design elements.  It features a bell and clock tower with its slate-shingled cone steeple, gabled vent dormers and Vendramini windows at cardinal points. The associated parsonage was built in 1881, and is a limestone rubble block building with segmental arched windows.

It was listed on the National Register of Historic Places in 1982.

References

Churches in the Roman Catholic Diocese of Jefferson City
Churches on the National Register of Historic Places in Missouri
Gothic Revival church buildings in Missouri
Romanesque Revival church buildings in Missouri
Roman Catholic churches completed in 1879
Houses on the National Register of Historic Places in Missouri
Buildings and structures in Osage County, Missouri
National Register of Historic Places in Osage County, Missouri
19th-century Roman Catholic church buildings in the United States